Ernest Izard (18 February 1868 – 23 March 1948) was a New Zealand cricketer. He played in seven first-class matches for Wellington and Taranaki from 1890 to 1898.

See also
 List of Wellington representative cricketers

References

External links
 

1868 births
1948 deaths
New Zealand cricketers
Wellington cricketers
Taranaki cricketers
Cricketers from Wellington City